Jair Alejandro González Romo (born 4 March 2002) is a Mexican professional footballer who plays as a midfielder for Liga MX club Santos Laguna.

Career statistics

Club

References

External links
 
 
 

2002 births
Living people
Mexican footballers
Mexico youth international footballers
Association football midfielders
Santos Laguna footballers
Liga MX players
Footballers from Durango
People from Durango City